The Riptide Movement are an Irish rock band formed in Dublin, Ireland in 2006 by songwriter and vocalist Malachy Tuohy, guitarist John Dalton, bassist and harmonica player Gerry McGarry and drummer Gar Byrne.

Members
 Malachy Tuohy - Songwriter, lead vocals, guitar, piano.
 Gerry McGarry - Bass, harmonica, vocals.
 JPR Dalton - Lead guitar, vocals.
 Gar Byrne - Drums, percussion, vocals.

Discography

Studio albums

History

2009
"Early Years", "Green Tortoise", "Cold Wind Blows", "Downtown Motel" and "All My Thoughts" were all songs on their earliest E.P.
After relocating to London, they began playing in venues such as The Spice Of Life, Lark in the Park, The Barfly, Dublin Castle and The 12 Bar.
Whilst performing at the In The City Festival in Manchester, they encountered renowned producer Tony Colton. Colton, who is highly regarded for his work with Rory Gallagher, Ray Charles, Yes and Heads, Hands and Feet, would later produce their début album, "What About The Tip Jars?"

Production of What About The Tip Jars?
What About The Tip Jars? was produced by Tony Colton; it was recorded over a two-year period; most of the recordings were done in Ireland, although some mixing was done in London and later some piano and B3 work was added in Nashville by Reese Wynam (The Allman Brothers Band, Stevie Ray Vaughan).

2010–2011
The band spend a lot of time touring, not only around Ireland but overseas in Germany, Czech Republic, England and Russia, whilst also recording in France. They first release single Hot Tramp on 20 September, which reaches number one on the Physical Singles Chart, and number twenty seven on the Irish Singles Chart. They release demo CD Hot Tramp which contains tracks such as Keep On Keepin' On, Hard To Explain, and Cocaine Cowboys, all of which become live staples, and make their way onto the second album.

2012
Second album Keep On Keepin' On is released on 20 April to great critical acclaim. It reached number six on the Irish Albums Chart, and major music retailer HMV sells out of copies within ten days of its release. The band begin a nationwide promotion tour and play numerous festivals, including Electric Picnic, Festival Of The Fires, Indiependence, Sea Sessions and Knockanstockan. This summer also saw the end of the band's tradition of busking, mainly on Grafton Street, as their schedule became too hectic.

On 17 October the band travelled to India to play a series of gigs as part of the Rendezvous Festival in New Delhi. This has been their furthest performance from home to date, and Hot Press magazine featured the tour in their Christmas Annual for the Most Unusual Gig Of The Year spot.

The 10 November saw the band play their largest headline show at the Olympia Theatre, Dublin where they played to a crowd of 1,300, before continuing their tour around Ireland.

2013
Following on the success of the previous Olympia gig, the band put on two more shows in Ireland in May, to sell out crowds, followed by another Irish tour before doing the festival scene in Europe, including Benicassim and Glastonbury. Later that year, the band played a series of concerts in the USA.

2014
The band signed a record deal with Universal Music in early 2014 ahead of the release date of their 3rd album Getting Through. The album was released on 4 April with a sell out album launch at Vicar Street. The following week the album reached number 1 in the charts. The album features the hit single All Works Out that stars actress Amy Huberman in a video for the song. On 5 May 2014 the ad for Discover Ireland was launched featuring ''All Works Out', it also includes hit songs 'You & I' and 'Animal'.

Getting Through is a gold selling album in Ireland and was released globally in 2015.

2016

The band released their 4th studio album 'Ghosts' to critical acclaim, it was recorded in Sonic Ranch Studios in Texas, produced by Ted Hutt and it charted at 5 in the Official Irish album Charts. The album includes hit songs 'Elephant in the room' 'Changeling' and ' Scull and Crossbones'.

2018
The band released a 2 track EP called 'Plastic Oceans' featuring the songs 'Plastic Oceans' and ' What will the kids say?' Recorded in 
'State of the Ark' studios in London and produced by Chris Coady.

2019
The band released their 6th studio record 'Something Special' to critical acclaim, it was recorded in Attica studios and co -produced by Tommy McLoughlin. The album includes hit songs 'I'll be there' 'Something Special' and 'Fall a little more in love'.

References

External links
 Official website
 YouTube

Musical groups from County Dublin
Musical groups established in 2006
Irish blues rock musical groups
Irish rock music groups
Irish folk musical groups